Antonio Román (9 November 1911 – 16 June 1989) was a prolific Spanish film director, screenwriter, film producer.

Antonio Román was born Ourense, Spain on November 9, 1911. Román began directing films in the later 1930s starting with documentaries. His first dramatic feature film was Esquadrilla. His other work includes an adaptation of Lola Montes and La Fierecilla domada, a retelling of The Taming of the Shrew. Many of these films star his wife, actress Yvonne Bastien.

Román has won several international awards such as Golden Olive Tree from the Cine de Humor de Bordighera in Italy for Bombas para la paz and an award for Pacto de silencio from the Cork Festival in Ireland.

Román died on June 16, 1989. Prior to his death, he worked with Radio Exterior. The Spanish newspaper El País stated on his death that Román was one of the most "prominent names in post-war Spanish cinema" directing over 30 films.

Filmography
Sandra (1930)
Ensueño (1931)
Canto à la emigración (1935)
Ciudad encantada (1936)
Barcelona o ritmo de un día (1939)
Mérida (1940)
Al borde del gran viaje (1940)
De la Alhambra al Albaicín (1940)
El hombre y el carro (1940)
Escuadrilla (1941)
Boda en el infierno (1942)
Intrigue (1942)
The House of Rain (1943)
Lola Montes (1944)
Last Stand in the Philippines (1945)
Fuenteovejuna (1947)
La vida encadenada (1948)
El amor brujo (1949)
Pacto de silencio (1949)
El pasado amenaza (1950)
La fuente enterrada (1950)
La forastera (1951)
Last Day (1952)
Congress in Seville (1955)
La fierecilla domada (1956)
Dos novias para un torero (1956)
Madrugada (1957)
Los clarines del miedo (1958)
Bombas para la paz (1959)
Mi mujer me gusta más (1961)
El sol en el espejo (1962)
Pacto de silencio (1963)
Un tiro por la espalda (1964)
Ringo de Nebraska (1966)
A Dog in Space (1966)
El mesón del gitano (1969)

References

Sources

External links

1911 births
1989 deaths
People from Ourense
Spanish film producers
Spanish film directors
Spanish male writers
Male screenwriters
Spanish film critics
20th-century Spanish screenwriters
20th-century Spanish male writers